Mansel Island (Inuktitut: Pujjunaq), a member of the Arctic Archipelago, is an uninhabited island in Qikiqtaaluk Region, Nunavut. It is located in Hudson Bay off of Quebec's Ungava Peninsula. At  in size, it is the 159th largest island in the world, and Canada's 28th largest island.

Mansel Island was named in 1613 by Sir Thomas Button after Vice-Admiral Sir Robert Mansell.

References

 Mansel Island at The Canadian Encyclopedia
 Sea islands: Atlas of Canada; Natural Resources Canada

Further reading

 Aylsworth, J. M., and W. Shilts. Surficial Geology of Coats and Mansel Islands, Northwest Territories. [Ottawa]: Energy, Mines, and Resources Canada, 1991. 
 Comock. Comock: the True Story of an Eskimo Hunter as told to Robert Flaherty. Photographs by Robert Flaherty. Text by Robert Flaherty and Edmund Carpenter. Jaffrey, N.H.: David R. Godine, 2003.
 Furnell, D. J. Summer Polar Bear Tagging on Mansel Island, N.W.T. [Yellowknife]: N.W.T. Wildlife Service, Govt. of the Northwest Territories, 1979.
 Polunin, Nicholas. Additions to the Floras of Southampton and Mansel Islands, Hudson Bay. Contributions of The Gray Herbarium, Harvard University, No.165. 1947.

Islands of Hudson Bay
Uninhabited islands of Qikiqtaaluk Region
Hudson's Bay Company trading posts in Nunavut
Former populated places in the Qikiqtaaluk Region